This is a list of University of Manchester people. Many famous or notable people have worked or studied at the Victoria University of Manchester and the University of Manchester Institute of Science and Technology institutions, which combined in 2004 to form the University of Manchester.

The following list includes the names of all 25 Nobel prize laureates among them (in bold print).

Alumni

Fine and applied arts

Architecture
 Stephen Hodder, English architect, winner of the RIBA Stirling Prize in 1996
 Dalibor Vesely, architect (RIBA Annie Spink Award for Excellence in Architectural Education 2006)
 Paul Waterhouse, son of Alfred Waterhouse. He designed Girton College at Cambridge University as well as the Manchester Museum, Refuge Assurance Building, the Christie Library and the Whitworth Hall in Manchester.

Literature

Music
 Martin Butler, composer
 John Casken, composer and professor of composition
 Peter Maxwell Davies, composer
 Ed O'Brien, Member of Radiohead

Theatre, cinema and broadcasting

Others
G. Howell-Baker (1871-1919), artist and illustrator (at Owen's College)
Natalia Fuchs, art critic, new media researcher, international curator and cultural producer.
Tessa Jackson, contemporary art curator, writer and administrator
Pat McDonagh (fashion designer), fashion designer
Tom Palin, painter
Johnny Rozsa, photographer

Natural and applied sciences
William Boyd Dawkins, geologist
James Lovelock, independent scientist and prominent environmentalist. Proposed the Gaia hypothesis. Graduated with a degree in chemistry in 1941.
Sir John Maddox, Editor of Nature for 22 years
Gordon Manley, climatologist

Psychology
C. E. M. Hansel
Adrian Wells

Biology and chemistry

Computer science

Engineering

Mathematics

Physics

Physiology and medicine
The University of Manchester currently has 28 Fellows of the Academy of Medical Sciences. Present and historical University of Manchester people notable for their contributions to medicine and physiology include:

Social sciences and education

Business

Economics

Education

Law, public administration and social welfare

Politics

Social anthropology
Richard T. Antoun, Professor Emeritus of Anthropology at Binghamton University, stabbed to death by student in 2009
Max Gluckman, Rhodes Scholar who became Manchester's first professor of social anthropology in 1949
Norman Long, known for his work on the sociology of international development
J. P. S. Uberoi, retired sociology professor at the Delhi School of Economics

Sociology
James Nazroo, Professor of Sociology

Others

History

Religion and philosophy

Sport

Crime
Reynhard Sinaga, Indonesian serial rapist and most prolific rapist in British legal history

Chancellors

Vice-Chancellors

See also
:Category:People associated with the University of Manchester
Natives of Manchester

References

 
Manchester